Nanty Perfedd is an area in the  community of Moelfre, Ynys Môn, Wales, which is 137.6 miles (221.5 km) from Cardiff and 216.3 miles (348.1 km) from London.

References

See also
List of localities in Wales by population

Villages in Anglesey